BraveStarr: The Movie (released as BraveStarr: The Legend in Europe and as The Legend of BraveStarr in the Philippines) is an animated space Western film released on March 18, 1988, by Taurus Entertainment. The film was based on Filmation's television series and Mattel's action figure of the same name, and it was also among the first animated features to use computer graphics.

The film tells the story of the original discovery of Kerium (a fictional ore that serves as the main plot element of the TV series), and how the Galactic Marshall Bravestarr came to battle Tex Hex (a wanted outlaw) and his master Stampede (an evil spirit in the form of a bull skull) on the planet of New Texas. It also introduces his allies: J.B. (a female judge), Thirty/Thirty (his talking horse, who can become bipedal and fight on his own), Deputy Fuzz (one of the Prairie People, the original indigenous people of New Texas), and the Shaman (BraveStarr's mentor who helps him discover his animal-based powers).

The PAL-based European version of the movie has been released to Region 1 DVD in a 2-disc set on July 3, 2007, release called The Best of BraveStarr from BCI Eclipse, with the second disc being five fan chosen 'best of' episodes from the TV series. The movie received its own single DVD release on May 6, 2008.

Unlike The Secret of the Sword (which was an edited version of the first five She-Ra episodes), the BraveStarr movie was produced and released following the conclusion of the TV series.

Sharing the same fate as the toy and TV show, the film received positive reviews from critics, but it was not a box-office success, playing only to weekend matinées in limited markets. A year after its release, Filmation closed down for good; its last full-length production, Happily Ever After, did not premiere until 1993.

Plot
Far out in space on New Texas, a single marshal protects a frontier people from the evil machinations of Stampede and his lackey, Tex Hex.

Cast
Charlie Adler as Deputy Fuzz / Tex Hex
Susan Blu	as Judge J.B.
Pat Fraley	as Marshall Bravestarr / Thunder Stick
Ed Gilbert	as Shaman / Thirty-thirty
Alan Oppenheimer as Stampede / Outlaw Skuzz

Reception
The film gained a positive response from critics despite failing at the box office.

References
Beck, Jerry (2005), pp. 41–2. The Animated Movie Guide. . Chicago Reader Press. Accessed April 8, 2007.

Notes

External links
 
 
 
 
 

1988 films
1988 animated films
1980s American animated films
1980s children's animated films
1980s science fiction films
1980s Western (genre) science fiction films
American Western (genre) science fiction films
American children's animated adventure films
American children's animated science fantasy films
American science fiction action films
Animated films based on animated series
Western (genre) animated films
1980s English-language films
Filmation animated films
Films about Native Americans
Films based on Mattel toys
Films based on television series
Films set on fictional planets
Space Western films
Films with screenplays by Bob Forward
Films produced by Lou Scheimer